Bulundi is a 1981 Hindi-language crime, thriller and drama film starring Raaj Kumar, Asha Parekh, Danny Denzongpa, Kim in pivotal roles. It was directed by Esmayeel Shroff and its music was composed by R. D. Burman. The film was remade in Tamil as Nermai.

Plot
Professor Satish Khurana lives with his wife Sarla and sister Leena. He has the highest reputation in the college where he teaches. One day, his friend Viju Mohanty requests him, via phone, to meet a rich businessman, Ranjeet Singh Lobo, to teach his son Manjeet private tuition. Satish, at first hesitates, but after meeting with Ranjeet, he accepts it. Manjeet was punctual in anything, but initially arrogant and disobedient, but after meeting with Satish he improves. Seeing this, Ranjeet's friends Madan Teja and Babulal Bhakri also request Satish for private tuition for their sons Vikram and Pawan respectively. After that, Satish is accused of divulging the questions via private tuition and is fired. Now, Satish doesn't know the background of Ranjeet, Madan and Babulal as he learns that they want to utilize him for their illegal works.

Cast
 Raaj Kumar as Professor Satish Khurana
 Asha Parekh as Sarla Khurana
 Danny Denzongpa as Ranjeet Singh Lobo / Manjeet Singh Lobo (dual role)
 Kim as Leena Khurana
 Raj Kiran as Vikram "Vicky" Teja
 Kulbhushan Kharbanda as Viju Mohanty
 Kader Khan as Madan Teja
 Jeevan as Babulal Bhakri
 Krishan Dhawan as Bhanodaya Khatri
 Rakesh Bedi as Pawan Bhakri
 Bharat Kapoor as Harish
 C. S. Dubey as Professor
 Helen as item dancer in bar in song "Tera Dil O Re Babu"
 Siddharth Kak as Inspector Salim

Soundtrack 
Lyricist: Majrooh Sultanpuri

References

External links

1980 films
1980s Hindi-language films
1980s action drama films
Hindi films remade in other languages
Indian action drama films
Films scored by R. D. Burman
1980 drama films
1981 drama films
1981 films